Richard Carpenter (born 30 September 1972) is an English footballer, born in Sheerness, who played as a midfielder for Gillingham, Fulham, Cardiff City and Brighton & Hove Albion. He made more than 500 appearances in the Football League over a 15-year professional career.

Career

Carpenter began his football career with Gillingham, and was part of the team promoted to Division Two in the 1995–96 season. He went on to make more than 250 appearances for Brighton & Hove Albion, and captained the side. In 2004, Carpenter was required to pay undisclosed damages to Chris Casper following a tackle in a league match on Boxing Day 1999, during his time playing for Cardiff City, that left Casper with a double fracture to his leg that subsequently saw him retire from professional football.

In February 2007 his contract was terminated by mutual consent, and he signed for Conference South club Welling United, where he became club captain and briefly caretaker manager, before leaving the club at the end of the 2007–08 season.

In February 2010, Carpenter played a one-off game for Whitehawk in a sixth round FA Vase tie at Gresley Rovers to solve an injury crisis, as a favour for the Hawks' manager Darren Freeman. He then came out of retirement to play for Whitehawk during their first season in Isthmian League Division One South.

Personal life
In 2012, Carpenter was sentenced to 200 hours of community service after pleading guilty to an assault charge following a brawl in The Red Lion pub in Hernhill.

References

External links

1972 births
Living people
People from Sheerness
English footballers
Association football midfielders
Gillingham F.C. players
Fulham F.C. players
Cardiff City F.C. players
Brighton & Hove Albion F.C. players
Welling United F.C. players
English Football League players
Welling United F.C. managers
Whitehawk F.C. players
English football managers
English Romani people